Short course swimming has been a sport at every Asian Indoor and Martial Arts Games.

Summary

Events

Men's events

Women's events

Medal table

List of records

References
2005 Asian Indoor Games official website
2007 Asian Indoor Games official website
2009 Asian Indoor Games results
2013 Asian Indoor and Martial Arts Games official website
2017 Asian Indoor and Martial Arts Games results book

Asian Indoor and Martial Arts Games
Short course swimming